The Episcopal Diocese of Springfield is a diocese of the Episcopal Church in the United States of America.  It is located in the state of Illinois and includes the area east of the Illinois River and south of the Counties of Woodford, Livingston, Ford, and Iroquois. The diocese was founded when the former Episcopal Diocese of Illinois split into three separate Dioceses (Springfield, Quincy, and Chicago) in 1877. 
 
On December 11, 2021, the Diocese elected the Very Rev. Brian K. Burgess of Woodbury, New Jersey to serve as the 12th Bishop of Springfield.

Parishes
Albion, Illinois: St. John's
Alton, Illinois: St. Paul's
Belleville, Illinois: St. George's
Bloomington, Illinois: St. Matthew's
Cairo, Illinois: Redeemer
Carbondale, Illinois: St. Andrew's
Carlinville, Illinois: St. Paul's
Centralia, Illinois: St. John's
Champaign, Illinois: 
Emmanuel Memorial
Chapel of St. John the Divine
Danville, Illinois: Holy Trinity
Decatur, Illinois: St. John's
Edwardsville, Illinois: St. Andrew's
Effingham, Illinois: St. Laurence
Glen Carbon, Illinois: St. Thomas'
Granite City, Illinois: St. Bartholomew's
Harrisburg, Illinois: St. Stephen's
Havana, Illinois: St. Barnabas'
Jacksonville, Illinois: Trinity
Lincoln, Illinois: Trinity
Marion, Illinois: St. James'
Mattoon, Illinois: Trinity
Morton, Illinois: All Saints'
Mt. Carmel, Illinois: St. John the Baptist
Mt. Vernon, Illinois: Trinity
Normal, Illinois: Christ the King
O'Fallon, Illinois: St. Michael's
Pekin, Illinois: St. Paul's
Rantoul, Illinois: St. Christopher's
Robinson, Illinois: St. Mary's
Salem, Illinois: St. Thomas'
Springfield, Illinois: 
Cathedral Church of St. Paul
Christ Church 
St. Luke's
West Frankfort, Illinois: St. Mark's

Bishops
 George Franklin Seymour, 1878-1906
 Edward William Osborne, diocesan 1906-1917
 Granville Hudson Sherwood, 1917-1923
 John Chanler White, 1924-1947
 Richard T. Loring, 1947-1948
 Charles A. Clough, 1948-1961
 Albert Arthur Chambers, 1962-1972
 Albert W. Hillestad, 1972-1981
 Donald M. Hultstrand, 1982-1991
 Peter H. Beckwith, 1992-2010
 Daniel Hayden Martins, 2011– June 30, 2021
 Brian K. Burgess, 2022-present

References

External links

Journal of the Annual Convention, Diocese of Springfield

Dioceses of the Episcopal Church (United States)
Diocese of Springfield
Religious organizations established in 1877
Anglican dioceses established in the 19th century
1877 establishments in Illinois
Province 5 of the Episcopal Church (United States)